Payraudeautia is a genus of predatory sea snails, marine gastropod mollusks in the family Naticidae, the moon snails.

Species
Species within the genus Payraudeautia include:

 Payraudeautia esterias P. Bernard, 1983
 Payraudeautia intricata (Donovan, 1804)

References

Naticidae